Annapolis is an unincorporated community located in Kitsap County, Washington. A foot ferry operated by Kitsap Transit connects Annapolis to nearby Bremerton.

References

Unincorporated communities in Kitsap County, Washington